Sylligma is a genus of spiders in the family Thomisidae. It was first described in 1895 by Simon. , it contains 7 African species.

Species
Sylligma comprises the following species:
Sylligma cribrata (Simon, 1901) – Ethiopia
Sylligma franki Lewis & Dippenaar-Schoeman, 2011 – Congo, Mozambique, Rwanda, Uganda
Sylligma hirsuta Simon, 1895 – Gabon, Congo, Rwanda, Namibia
Sylligma lawrencei Millot, 1942 – Gabon, Nigeria, Guinea, Congo
Sylligma ndumi Lewis & Dippenaar-Schoeman, 2011 – Botswana, South Africa
Sylligma spartica Lewis & Dippenaar-Schoeman, 2011 – Congo
Sylligma theresa Lewis & Dippenaar-Schoeman, 2011 – Nigeria, Rwanda, Kenya

References

Thomisidae
Araneomorphae genera
Spiders of Africa